KCLO-TV (channel 15) is a television station in Rapid City, South Dakota, United States, affiliated with CBS and The CW Plus. Owned by Nexstar Media Group, the station maintains a news bureau and advertising sales office on Canyon Lake Drive in Rapid City, and its transmitter is located on Skyline Drive near downtown.

Although identifying as a separate station in its own right, KCLO-TV is considered a semi-satellite of sister station KELO-TV (channel 11) in Sioux Falls, which operates two other semi-satellites: KDLO-TV (channel 3) in Florence and KPLO-TV (channel 6) in Reliance. KCLO-TV's master control, as well as most internal operations, are housed at KELO-TV's studios on Phillips Avenue in downtown Sioux Falls. KCLO-TV clears all network programming as provided through its parent, time-shifted for the Mountain Time Zone. It also simulcasts KELO-TV's newscasts (with local weather inserts), but airs a separate offering of syndicated programming; there are also separate commercial inserts and legal station identifications.

KCLO-TV's prime time schedule starts at 6 p.m. rather than the usual 7 p.m. start for the rest of the Mountain Time Zone, or in the Central Time Zone, where the rest of the KELOLAND stations are located. While KCLO-TV initially carried network programs on an hour delay from KELO-TV when it became a full-power station, it began airing them—and KELO's Sioux Falls-based news—live in January 1991 during the Gulf War and announced it would do so permanently. It is also one of three CBS affiliates in the United States to air their prime time schedule before or after the national schedule starts in its official time: KOVR in Sacramento, like KCLO-TV, also starts its prime time schedule an hour earlier at 7 p.m. in the Pacific Time Zone instead of the customary 8 p.m. start, while KUAM-DT2 in Guam starts its schedule at 8 p.m. in order to avoid competing with its primary NBC subchannel's 7 p.m. schedule.

History
In 1980, Midcontinent Media filed to build a translator for KELO-TV on channel 15 in Rapid City. At the time, Rapid City was one of the few markets in the country without full service from all three major networks. CBS programming was divided between then-ABC affiliate KOTA-TV and then-NBC affiliate KEVN; the two stations carried up to six hours each of CBS programming each week. Black Hills cable viewers could watch the full CBS schedule on KMGH-TV from Denver. The Federal Communications Commission (FCC) approved the application in November despite protests from KOTA and KEVN; in particular, KOTA feared allowing a KELO-TV translator in the Black Hills would give that station a "monopoly position" in South Dakota television. 

The new KELO-TV translator, K15AC, began broadcasting September 26, 1981. Operating at 1,000 watts, it brought CBS programming to viewers within a 35-mile radius of Rapid City. It initially operated with a shoestring staff, with a resident manager based at his home in Rapid City and a single reporter whose stories ran on KELO-TV's Big News. It also did not sell advertising in the Black Hills at the outset. The translator received the signal of KELO-TV satellite KPLO-TV in Reliance/Pierre and beamed it through three microwave sites to Rapid City.

While K15AC displaced KMGH on Rapid City cable systems, it was initially unable to get on cable systems outside the city. According to KELO broadcast operations head Evans Nord, this was because KOTA-TV owner Duhamel Broadcasting Enterprises refused to allow the South Dakota Cable Company, which held the cable franchise for most of the Black Hills region outside Rapid City, to add K15AC. Duhamel was half-owner of South Dakota Cable along with Midcontinent Media. This posed a problem in an area where cable has long been all but essential for acceptable television. With this in mind, two years after K15AC began operating, Midcontinent applied for a new full-power license on channel 15, which was granted in January 1987 and took the call letters KBLO-TV that May. It was licensed for 700,000 watts with almost double the coverage area of K15AC. KBLO-TV was planned for local program origination, unlike its sister stations KDLO or KPLO. (The call sign was changed to KCLO-TV in May 1988.) Midcontinent invested $1.7 million to convert the Rapid City operation to full power. Upon signing on as a full-power station on November 28, 1988, KCLO-TV aired KELO-TV's newscasts on an hour delay, with five-minute local cut-ins at 6 p.m. and 10 p.m. The local cut-ins were discontinued in January 1991 when KCLO-TV began airing all local and network programming live, time-shifted for the Mountain Time Zone. According to station officials, this was initially intended to allow Black Hills viewers to stay abreast of late-breaking war coverage. Due to favorable reception of the shuffled schedule, Midcontinent decided to make the shifted schedule permanent,  thus returning to the schedule that had aired in Rapid City between 1981 and 1988.

In 1995, Midcontinent Media sold the KELOLAND stations, including KCLO-TV, to Young Broadcasting; the sale was approved by the FCC on May 31, 1996.

On June 6, 2013, Young Broadcasting announced that it would merge with Media General. The merger was approved by the FCC on November 8, after Media General shareholders approved the merger a day earlier; it was completed on November 12.

On January 27, 2016, Nexstar Broadcasting Group announced that it had reached an agreement to acquire Media General, including KCLO-TV, with the sale being completed on January 17, 2017.

Subchannels
The station's digital signal is multiplexed:

KCLO-TV's digital configuration has The CW Plus on channel 15.2, Ion Television on 15.3 and Ion Mystery on 15.4. By 2019, "The Black Hills' CW" had been airing in 720p HD over-the-air, per additional distribution of digital bandwidth into channel 15.2 and further compression of the remaining three subchannels of KCLO-TV.

MyUTV, which is carried on the second digital subchannels of KELO-TV, KDLO-TV and KPLO-TV, is not seen in the Rapid City market on KCLO-TV. The UPN affiliate for Rapid City was KCPL-LP (channel 52), and the MyNetworkTV affiliate is KWBH-LD which is simulcast over KNBN-DT2 (channel 21.2; formerly KKRA-LP, channel 24); as a result, MyUTV still cannot be carried on KCLO-TV by FCC market rules.

References

External links

The Black Hills CW KCLO-DT2 5.2 Website

CBS network affiliates
Television channels and stations established in 1988
1988 establishments in South Dakota
CLO-TV
Ion Television affiliates
Ion Mystery affiliates